The Trinidadian and Tobagonian ambassador in Washington, D.C. is the official representative of the government of the Republic of Trinidad and Tobago to the government of the United States and representative to the Organization of American States.

List of representatives

References 

 
Trinidad and Tobago
United States|